"" ("March of Azerbaijan") is the national anthem of Azerbaijan. The music was composed by Uzeyir Hajibeyov, with lyrics by poet Ahmad Javad. The government officially adopted the anthem in 1920, with the passage of the decree, "On the State Hymn of the Republic of Azerbaijan". In 1992, after the fall of the Soviet Union, Azerbaijan's government officially restored "" as the national anthem.

The Azerbaijan government has also officially declared the national anthem to be "the sacred symbol of the Azerbaijan state, its independence and unity."

Since 2006, a fragment of the lyrics is depicted on the obverse of the 5 manat banknote. In 2011, to mark the 20th anniversary of independence, a stamp featuring the lyrics was issued.

History

In 1919, during the formation of the Azerbaijan Democratic Republic, the new government announced it was accepting submissions from the public for a national anthem, coat of arms and state seal. A prize of 15,000 rubles would be awarded to the citizen who submitted the winning anthem.

Azerbaijani composer Uzeyir Hajibeyov wrote two marches. In 1919, this work received the first award announced by the government of the Azerbaijan Democratic Republic. The second march was the "March of Azerbaijan." According to Turkish musicologist Etem Üngör, "In those years, when Azerbaijan had not yet lost its independence, the march was chanted by military schools before lessons."

In 1922 "" was replaced by Soviet communist anthem "The Internationale". In 1944, during World War II, the new Soviet national anthem replaced "The Internationale" and an additional anthem of the Azerbaijan Soviet Socialist Republic was installed.

In 1989, following several years of changes brought by perestroika, composer Aydin Azimov arranged a modern recording of the anthem by a full symphony and chorus. That fall, "" was broadcast on television and radios in Azerbaijan, 70 years after it was introduced.

Post-Soviet restoration
After the dissolution of the Soviet Union, in spring 1992, the leaders of the independent Azerbaijani government proposed that the original anthem should be restored as the anthem of Azerbaijan. The Milli Mejlis (National Assembly) signed it into law on 27 May 1992.

Lyrics

Current official

In other scripts

Regulations
Regulations for the performance of the national anthem are set forth in the law signed by President Heydar Aliyev in 1996. While a performance of the anthem may include only music, only words, or a combination of both, the anthem must be performed using the official music and words prescribed by law. Once a performance has been recorded, it may be used for any purpose, such as in a radio or television broadcast.

Musical adaptations
In 2012, Philip Sheppard with the London Philharmonic Orchestra recorded the anthem for the 2012 Summer Olympics and the 2012 Summer Paralympics.

Notes

References

External links
 Azərbaycan Respublikasının Dövlət Himni, Musiqini dinləmək (Instrumental)
 Azərbaycan Respublikasının Dövlət Himni, Himni dinləmək (Vocal)
 Instrumental from The Copyright Agency of the Republic of Azerbaijan website

Compositions by Uzeyir Hajibeyov
European anthems
National symbols of Azerbaijan
1920 songs
National anthems
National anthem compositions in D minor
National anthem compositions in A minor
National anthem compositions in G minor
Azerbaijani songs